The Embassy of Canada to Ukraine in Kyiv is the diplomatic mission of Canada to Ukraine.

History 
Canada was the first western nation to recognize Ukraine's independence on December 2, 1991. The existence of a large Ukrainian-Canadian community has led to continued close relations between the two nations. The Embassy of Canada to Ukraine was established on May 3, 1992. The Consulate of Canada in Lviv provides services to western Ukraine.

The Canadian embassy in Kyiv provides essential services to both Canadians and Ukrainians. Canadian citizens can contact the Canadian embassy if they are in need of medical assistance, notarial services, legal services, passport services or citizenship applications, registration of Canadians residing in Ukraine, information about local regulations, emergency services, financial assistance, money transfers, marriage, divorce and death certificates, assistance for arrested or detained Canadians, information on the whereabouts and well-being of Canadians in Ukraine, and information about child abduction and custody.

Since 20 November 2014 the Australian Embassy to Ukraine has been co-located in the same building under an agreement with the Government of Canada.

On 1 February 2014, an embassy staffer's car was torched after she attended anti-government rallies in the city.

On 18 February 2014, Russian news agency TASS reported that Oleg Tatarov, the deputy head of Ukraine’s Interior Ministry main investigative department, told of attacks on the Canadian embassy in Kyiv by "a group of unidentified persons armed with sticks". It was later revealed that demonstrators had sought refuge at the embassy with a representative of Canada's Minister of Foreign Affairs stating that the protesters had been "peaceful".

The embassy was closed after authorities stormed a camp of activists which triggered clashes that killed at least 26 people. A recorded message on the embassy’s phone lines cited security reasons. It said that embassy staff would continue to provide consular services, and asked Canadians in the country to contact the department if in need of help.

On 12 February 2022, the embassy was temporarily relocated to Lviv, as fears mounted of a possible Russian invasion of Ukraine. The embassy was returned to Kyiv on 8 May and was reopened by Canadian Prime Minister Justin Trudeau during a visit to the city.

List of ambassadors 
 François A. Mathys — Ambassador (September 1992 – August 1995)
 Christopher Westdal — Ambassador (January 1996 – August 1998)
 Derek Fraser — Ambassador (September 1998 – August 2001)
 Andrew Robinson — Ambassador (August 2001 – August 2005)
 Abaina M. Dann — Ambassador (September 2005 – August 2008)
 G. Daniel Caron — Ambassador (August 2008 – October 2011)
 Troy Lulashnyk — Ambassador (November 2011 – 2014)
  Roman Waschuk — Ambassador (2014 – 2019)
  Larisa Galadza — Ambassador (2019 – Present)

See also 
 Embassy of Ukraine, Ottawa
 Canada–Ukraine relations
 Diplomatic missions in Ukraine

References

External links 
 Embassy of Canada to Ukraine
 Ukrainian protesters seek refuge in Canadian Embassy amid crackdown
 Ukraine protesters seek safety at Canadian embassy, building not attacked: Foreign Affairs
 Embassy of Canada in Ukraine
 Embassies and Consulates
 Canadian Representatives in Ukraine - Kyiv

Canada–Ukraine relations
Canada
Kiev